Franz Porten (23 August 1859 – 21 May 1932) was a German actor and film director. He directed 19 films between 1906 and 1924. He was the father of actress and film producer Henny Porten, screenwriter, actress, and director Rosa Porten; and actor Fritz Porten.

Selected filmography
 The Secret of Wera Baranska (1919)

References

External links

1859 births
1932 deaths
German male film actors
Film directors from Rhineland-Palatinate
20th-century German male actors
People from Bernkastel-Wittlich
People from the Rhine Province